Garab Dorje (c. 665) was the first human to receive direct transmission teachings from Vajrasattva. Garab Dorje then became the teacher of the Ati Yoga (Tib. Dzogchen) or Great Perfection teachings according to Tibetan buddhist and Nyingma school traditions. The Tibetan Bon beliefs, which pre-date buddhism, differ in their origin story of Dzogchen.

Etymology
Garab Dorje (or Garap Dorje) is his only attested name. The Sanskrit offerings are reconstructions. No Sanskrit name has been found in a  colophon. That said, John Myrdhin Reynolds cited Prahevajra or Pramodavajra in his book Self-Liberation Through Seeing with Naked Awareness [rig pa ngo sprod gcer mthong rang grol].

Detail
According to the Nyingma school of Tibetan Buddhism, Garab Dorje transmitted the complete empowerments of Dzogchen to Manjushrimitra, who was regarded as his chief disciple. Padmasambhava is also known to have received the transmission of the Dzogchen tantras directly from Garab Dorje.

Garab Dorje received the empowerment and transmission of the Mahayoga teachings of the Secret Matrix Tradition (Guhyagarbha tantra) from Mahasiddha Kukuraja.

Birth
Garab Dorje is said to have received all the Tantras, scriptures and oral instructions of Dzogchen directly from Vajrasattva and Vajrapani.

The Nyingmapa lineage conveys Garab Dorje's birth to be a miraculous birth by a virgin daughter of the king of Odiyana (Uddiyana), and that he recited Dzogchen tantras at his birth.

A detailed interpretation of the hagiographic nativity of Garab Dorje briefly contextualizes his mother, a bhikṣuṇī whose sadhana was Yoga tantra, and her parents. The bhiksuni daughter has a dream in which a man holds the vase of the Astamangala, the 'threefold world', with the syllables 'oṃ  ā  hūṃ' and svāhā:

Teachings
In the tradition of the oral transmission lineage, Garab Dorje's teachings are also shared through quotations.

Before becoming Garab Dorje's student, Manjushrimitra heard of Garab Dorje's Dzogchen teachings, and sought a debate to defeat the heretical views. Manjushrimitra lost the debate and realized his errors. Garab Dorje then gave Manjushrimitra the complete Dzogchen empowerments, and summarized his teaching as follows: The nature of mind is the original Buddha without birth or cessation, like the sky! When you understand that, all apparent phenomena are beyond birth and cessation. Meditating means letting this condition be as it is, without seeking.

As Garab Dorje attained paranirvana, his body dissolved into a mist of rainbow light. Manjushrimitra called to his teacher and Garab Dorje responded by handing his last teaching to Manjushrimitra, which was enclosed in a golden casket the size of a thumbnail.  Inside, the three precepts known as the Three Words that Strike to the Heart of the Essential Point, or Tsig Sum Nèdek, contain the whole of the Dzogchen teachings, and are a universal introduction to Dzogchen.

Garab Dorje's "Three Words that Strike to the Heart" are considered the essential teaching by Dilgo Khyentse Rinpoche, and the infallible key point by Patrul Rinpoche. "The Three Statements that Strike the Vital Point" teaching, as translated by Lotsawa House:

Writings
Though not his writings the tradition holds that the Seventeen Tantras were directly revealed to Garab Dorje. The following texts are attributed to Garab Dorje:
 "Cutting Through the Three Times" 
 "Overwhelming the Six Modes of Consciousness with Splendour" 
 "Natural Freedom That Underlies Characteristics" 
 "Direct Encounter with the Three Kayas" 
 "Vajra Fortress"
 "Deep Immersion in Awareness"

See also
 
 Merlin - also said to have been conceived by a nun without a human father

References

Notes

Citations

Works cited

Further reading

Dzogchen lamas
Dzogchen lineages
Nyingma lamas